Morayfield State High School is a public, coeducational high school in Morayfield, Queensland, Australia. It first opened its doors on 28 January 1981.

Campus
Morayfield High School sits beside the intersection of Visentin Road and Buchanan Road.

The school campus is located directly over the road from Morayfield Train Station.

The campus consists mostly of several single-storey buildings along two avenues emanating from a central courtyard, with one two level, modern, predominantly Maths building.  Most buildings are purpose-built for particular curricula; for example, science labs and art studios.  The campus includes sporting facilities on its periphery.

Student support
The school has numerous support services in place for its students.

Guidance officer
School nurse
Aboriginal and Torres Strait Islander Support Unit
Year level coordinators
Special Education Unit / Special Needs Support
Coordinator Indigenous Education
Pan Pacific Islander Liaison Officer
Youth support coordinator

There is also a member of the Christian religious community at the school to provide chaplaincy support.

Curriculum
"All students in Years 8 and 9 complete studies from the Key Learning Areas: English, Mathematics, Science, Studies of Society and Environment, Health and Physical Education, Technology, and The Arts. Students in Year 8 may also choose to study French and they may elect to continue these studies in Year 9. Literacy and Numeracy classes are also available in year 8 and 9."

"Senior Education and Training Plans are developed for all students in the school, identifying a designated pathway to Tertiary Studies, Further Training or employment. Students in Year 10 select a course of study that prepares them for studies in Years 11 and 12. Year 11 and 12 students complete studies in English and Mathematics and a selection of Queensland Studies Authority Subjects, Queensland Studies Authority Registered Subjects and Vocational education and training certificates. Traineeships and school based apprenticeships are also available."

Notes

External links
Morayfield State High School

Public high schools in Queensland
Schools in South East Queensland
Educational institutions established in 1981
1981 establishments in Australia